The Carps were a Canadian rock music duo consisting of bassist Neil White and drummer Jahmal Tonge. They were signed to Toronto-based URBNET Records.

Bio
(All Music Guide)
Rarely photographed without multi-colored leather hi tops, turquoise or pink T-shirts, and skinny jeans, the two members of the Carps wear their hipster cred on their sleeves while making a full and unique blend of R&B and stripped-down indie rock—as a two-piece, no less. Neil White became friends with Jahmal Tonge at a young age in Toronto, and the two started creating music as a free-spirited pastime to fill the hours between skateboarding and golfing of all things.

Melding influences from the opposite ends of the musical spectrum (Tonge grew up on Motown while White listened to psychedelic rock and punk), the duo started jamming and playing clubs around the city. With a soulful Terence Trent D'Arby-esque voice, Tonge took to the drum stool vocalizing about urban strife and the debauchery of hipsters, while White added to the meat of the sound with dirty, distorted bass tones.

After shows in the Toronto clubs resulted in unenthused audiences, the two decided to take it to the States and organized a small tour to Philadelphia and New York City. The shows in the U.S. were a different story, where the indie crowds welcomed them with open arms, and soon after, the two were invited to join the roster of Urbnet Records. In 2007, their anticipated EP, The Young and Passionate Days of Carpedia, was released. ~ Jason Lymangrover, All Music Guide

History
The band began its career in Scarborough, Toronto in 2005.

In addition to touring Europe and North America, The Carps have played with The Cool Kids, MIA, Holy Fuck, The Hives and Lupe Fiasco.

Singer Jahmal Tonge is featured on the MSTRKRFT album Fist Of God, on Breakaway and So Deep.

The Carps have released two EPs to critical acclaim, and have been applauded for their ability to weave genres of all types into a seamless and cohesive sound.

In March 2007, The Young & Passionate Days of Carpedia vol 2.1 was released under URBNET Records.
This was followed by the release of Waves & Shambles in April 2008, containing the featured track Veronica Belmont which was named after a well-known San Francisco-based tech journalist. The album also included an appearance by The Cool Kids on the Heaven's Gates & Hell’s Flames remix (produced by Jahmal Tonge).

The Carps did not release a debut album and, citing other commitments, stopped touring in 2010.

Discography

EPs
 The Young & Passionate Days of Carpedia vol 2.1 (March 13, 2007)
 Waves & Shambles (April 8, 2008)

See also

Canadian rock
List of bands from Canada
List of Canadian musicians
:Category:Canadian musical groups

References

External links
The Carps

Musical groups established in 2005
Musical groups established in 2010
Canadian indie rock groups
Musical groups from Toronto
Scarborough, Toronto
2005 establishments in Ontario
2010 disestablishments in Ontario